Shukh is the third studio album by Bangladeshi rock band LRB. It was released on 24 June 1993 by Soundtek Electronics. It featured the hit song "Cholo Bodle Jai". The album is considered to be the most commercially successful album of the band and one of the greatest albums of Bangladesh, featuring songs like "Cholo Bodle Jai", "Rupali Guitar", "Gotokal Raate" and "Kemon Acho". It was the last album to feature drummer Habib Anwar Joy. Most of the lyrics in this album were written by Bappy Khan.

Track listing 
All the lyrics written by Bappi Khan, except where noted.

Personnel 

Love Runs Blind
 Ayub Bachchu - lead vocals, lead guitars
 S.I. Tutul - keyboards, rhythm guitars and backing vocals
 Saidul Hasan Swapan - bass
 Habib Anwar Joy - drums

Lyrics
 Bappi Khan - Track 3, 4, 5 (Side A) and 6 (Side B)
 Kausar Ahmed Chaudhury - Track 5 (Side A) and 6 (Side B)

Production
 Recorded at - Audio Art Studio
 Sound engineering and mixing - Azam Babu 
 Sleeve designed by - Mainul Hossen

See also 
 Love Runs Blind discography

References

External links 
Stream the album on Spotify 
Listen to the album on Saavn

1993 albums
Love Runs Blind albums